Persi may refer to:

People
 Persi Diaconis (born 1945), American mathematician and former professional magician
 Persi Iveland, a member of the Norwegian rock band DumDum Boys
 Raymond S. Persi (born 1975), American animator, director, screenwriter, producer, storyboard artist and voice actor
 Silvia Persi (born 1965), Italian former swimmer

Other uses
 Buravet, Armenia, an abandoned settlement formerly named Persi
 Periodical Source Index
 Public Employee Retirement System of Idaho

See also
 Perci (disambiguation)
 Percy (disambiguation)